The Hong Kong Letters Patent 1917 was one of the principal constitutional instruments of Hong Kong when she was a British Crown colony and dependent territory; the other principal constitutional instruments were the Hong Kong Letters Patent 1960, the Hong Kong Letters Patent 1982, the Hong Kong Letters Patent 1991 (No. 1), and the Hong Kong Royal Instructions 1917. The Hong Kong Letters Patent 1917 has been amended many times since its coming into force.

The Hong Kong Letters Patent 1917 superseded the letters patent issued on 5 April 1843, all subsequent letters patent amending the 1843 one, and the letters patent issued on 19 January 1888 (which replaced the 1843 letters patent and all those amending the 1843 one). The 1917 letters patent, as amended from time to time, remained part of the basis for Hong Kong's system of government until the transfer of the territory's sovereignty on 1 July 1997 to the People's Republic of China.

Issued under the royal prerogative, the letters patent was the formal legal basis of the office of Governor and Commander-in-Chief, the Executive Council, and the Legislative Council.

After the transfer of sovereignty to China, the Hong Kong Letters Patent 1917 ceased to have legal effect, as it is superseded by the new Basic Law.

See also

 Hong Kong Letters Patent (see this article for a list of all Hong Kong Letters Patent)
 Hong Kong Royal Instructions 1917
 Hong Kong Royal Instructions (see this article for a list of all Hong Kong Royal Instructions and all Hong Kong Additional Instructions)
 History of Hong Kong
 Colonial Hong Kong
 Letters patent
 Royal assent
 Estatuto Orgânico de Macau, Portuguese Macau equivalent

Footnotes

External links

Full text of the Hong Kong Letters Patent 1917 as of 30 June 1997
Full texts of all Hong Kong Letters Patent

Hong Kong Letters Patent
History of Hong Kong
Law of Hong Kong
Defunct constitutions